The Policía de Seguridad Aeroportuaria (Airport Security Police; PSA) is an Argentine law enforcement agency created to protect and guard national public airports. It was the first federally owned police institution, managed by civilians, to be created after Argentina's return to democracy in 1983.

Formation
On February 22, 2005, the national government, via Néstor Kirchner's presidential Decree No. 145/2005, transferred - structurally and functionally - the militarized National Aeronautical Police (Policía Aeronautica Nacional PAN) from within the Ministry of Defence to the Interior Ministry's orbit, creating the Airport Security Police, and joining it to the Homeland Security System. It belongs to the Ministry of Security. The decree also formalized the adoption of civil administration to this new police force, in order to restructure and normalize it. Its director is Marcelo Saín.

Functions
The mission of the Airport Security Police (PSA) is airport security. This is understood as a specific aspect of public safety, and includes actions to protect and safeguard internal security within the jurisdiction of airports, through prevention, intelligence gathering and investigation of crimes and offenses that are not covered by the Aeronautics Code. PSA is therefore in charge of:

 Airport preventive safety, which includes the planning, implementation, evaluation and / or coordination of activities and operations, at the tactical and strategic levels - necessary for counteracting, averting and investigating crimes and offenses in the ambit of the airport.
 Complex airport safety, consisting of the design, implementation and / or coordination of activities and operations - at the tactical and strategic levels - necessary for control and counteraction of complex criminal acts committed by criminal organizations, related to drug trafficking, terrorism, smuggling and other related offenses.

Unlike most police forces the ASP sports only an officers corps and no other ranks.

See also
Argentine Federal Police
Argentine National Gendarmerie
Argentine Naval Prefecture
Buenos Aires Police
Interior Security System

References

External links
 

Federal law enforcement agencies of Argentina
Aviation in Argentina